Langham Square (formerly known as South Unionville Square) is a  Asian-themed shopping, office and residential complex in Markham, Ontario, Canada. It is located at the intersection of Kennedy Road and South Unionville Avenue, which is north of the 407 ETR and east of Downtown Markham. Its Chinese name “朗豪坊” echoes Langham Place, a shopping and office complex located in Mong Kok, Hong Kong.

It is primarily a mall to serve the growing Asian community. The complex includes a condominium tower and townhouses with commercial retail/professional offices.  It is anchored at the concourse level by T & T Supermarket, which belongs to the group of Loblaws Ltd. chain stores. On the south end of the complex is a 12 floor 253 unit condo tower.

Description

The Mall at Langham Square is a mixed-use development home to a wide range of prime retail, restaurant, office and medical space.

The Lane at Langham Square is a shopping retail level of the mall home to a wide variety of shops and services. It is connected to the condominium tower.

The Markham Chinese Cultural Centre of F.C.C.M services is located inside Langham Square.

Transportation
The mall is accessible via the nearby Unionville GO Station, multiple York Region Transit/Viva Rapid Transit bus stops within walking distance, the 407 ETR and its close proximity to Downtown Markham.

There is an underground parking lot and limited above ground parking spaces service patrons to the mall.

References

External links
 

Shopping malls in the Regional Municipality of York
Shopping malls established in 2013
Buildings and structures in Markham, Ontario
Tourist attractions in Markham, Ontario
2013 establishments in Ontario